Sandro Victor Silva Santos (born 22 May 1981), commonly known as Sandrinho, is a former Brazilian footballer.

Career statistics

Club

Notes

References

1981 births
Living people
Brazilian footballers
Association football defenders
Association football midfielders
Moto Club de São Luís players
Esporte Clube Internacional players
Sinop Futebol Clube players
Cuiabá Esporte Clube players
People from Maceió
Sportspeople from Alagoas